The yellow-headed box turtle or golden-headed box turtle (Cuora aurocapitata) is a proposed species of turtle in the family Geoemydidae (formerly Bataguridae). It is sometimes considered a subspecies of Pan's box turtle (Cuora pani aurocapitata).

This turtle is endemic to the central Chinese Anhui province. It is found in Nanling County, Yi County, Guangde County, and Jing County.

References

Reptiles of China
Cuora
Reptiles described in 1988
Taxonomy articles created by Polbot
Critically endangered fauna of China